The 1974 Nebraska Cornhuskers football team represented the University of Nebraska–Lincoln in the 1974 NCAA Division I football season. The team was coached by Tom Osborne and played their home games in Memorial Stadium in Lincoln, Nebraska.

Schedule

Roster

Depth chart

Coaching staff

Game summaries

Oregon

Oregon's only score came in the 4th quarter against Nebraska reserves, as the Cornhuskers entirely demolished the Webfoots in Lincoln to open the season 1-0.

Wisconsin

Wisconsin's air attack provided the Badgers with a 242-47 passing margin, while Nebraska's ground attack rolled up a 258-77 yard advantage on the ground, and the Cornhuskers led Wisconsin for all but six minutes of the game and were still in front by 6 when the Badgers pulled out a 77-yard touchdown pass and successful PAT with 3:29 in the 4th to pull ahead by 1 point, sending the Cornhuskers home with an early-season loss.

Northwestern

Nebraska RB Monte Anthony set a new freshman record with his 111 yards on 14 carries as Nebraska rolled up 563 total offensive yards on the way to exacting some revenge on the Big Ten Conference following the previous week's loss to Wisconsin.

Minnesota

Nebraska's wrath toward the Big 10 was not completed yet, as the Cornhuskers steamrolled Minnesota 54-0 in a dominating defeat of the Golden Gophers.

Missouri

Missouri, while unable to come up with any points of their own early on, still managed to hold Nebraska to a 10-0 lead well into the 4th quarter before suddenly coming to life and putting up 21 unanswered points in a stunning upset that left Nebraska winless at the outset of their conference schedule.

Kansas

For the second time this season, #12 Nebraska came off of a loss with a vengeance, smashing #13 Kansas in a 56-0 rout at Lawrence.  Nebraska QB Dave Humm set a new Nebraska and Big 8 completion percentage record, a new team and conference season touchdowns record, and a new team/conference/national record of 15 consecutive pass completions, going 23 of 27 with no interceptions for the day, an especially remarkable event considering that the Cornhusker offense was known for its land-based attack. More than half of the sellout crowd were Nebraska fans who made the short drive south.

Oklahoma State

Oklahoma State outrushed Nebraska 204-167 but was able to produce only a 4th-quarter field goal, as Nebraska was also stymied offensively yet was able to survive the game by riding a single 3rd-quarter touchdown for the win.  The Blackshirts saved the day, recovering a Cowboy fumble, reeling in an interception, and blocking a field goal attempt to help preserve the win.

Colorado

Looking at the statistics might suggest this game was close, but Nebraska was comfortably leading 31-0 in the 4th when Cornhusker reserves took over and allowed Colorado to put up some numbers of their own to make it not look so bad.  Despite nearly matched final offensive yardage and first down totals, the Buffaloes were unable to overcome a painful 1-5 turnover deficit.

Iowa State

The story of the previous game repeated itself, as Nebraska was out in front with an adequate lead when Cornhusker reserves entered the game to mop things up, which allowed Iowa State to put up 13 points for their game total, merely tying Nebraska's 3rd quarter output.

Kansas State

For the 8th straight game, the Blackshirts held their opponent scoreless for 3 of 4 quarters in a game, as Nebraska easily defeated Kansas State in Lincoln.

Oklahoma

Nebraska had a chance to run with the momentum, after breaking a 7-7 halftime tie open a few minutes into the 3rd quarter and then recovering Oklahoma's fumble on the following kickoff, but the opportunity was wasted when the Cornhuskers could not convert the gift into points, and the game belonged to the Sooners from there on out as Oklahoma put up 21 unanswered points to take back the lead and win.

Unlike the previous three meetings, which were televised nationally to a Thanksgiving Day audience by ABC, this game could not air due to Oklahoma's NCAA probation, which banned the Sooners from television for the 1974 and 1975 regular seasons.

Florida

Florida drew first blood, scoring a relatively early touchdown, and followed it up with a 2nd-quarter field goal to send Nebraska into the locker room at half time down 0-10.  As the third quarter drew to a close, Nebraska successfully held off the Gators in a goal line stand and then marched 99 yards to close the gap with Florida 7-10 at the start of the 4th, and was able to follow those points with two more field goals to pull ahead by 3, while Florida was unable to respond in kind to the comeback, giving up the game to Nebraska.

Rankings

Awards

NFL and Pro Players
The following Nebraska players who participated in the 1974 season later moved on to the next level and joined a professional or semi-pro team as draftees or free agents.

References

Nebraska
Nebraska Cornhuskers football seasons
Sugar Bowl champion seasons
Nebraska Cornhuskers football